Outside Looking In is a novel by American author T. C. Boyle. It was published on April 9, 2019.  It takes place during the Harvard LSD experiments of the early 1960s.  A version of Timothy Leary appears as a character, depicted as a "blend of cheerfulness and manipulation."

Outside Looking In received strong reviews. The Telegraph called Boyle "the undisputed master of what might be called biographical fiction."

References

2019 American novels
Novels by T. C. Boyle
English-language novels
Ecco Press books
Books about LSD